The 2010–11 Kategoria e Parë was the 64th season of a second-tier association football league in Albania.

Stadia and Location

League table

Promotion playoffs
The sixth- and fifth-place finishers in the league faced the 9th and 10th-placed teams of the 2010–11 Kategoria Superiore, respectively, in single match promotion playoffs.

All times CEST

References

Kategoria e Parë seasons
2
Alba